Thomas Lawrence Scott (October 9, 1907 – June 1962) was the very first head coach of the Old Dominion Monarchs football (then known as the Norfolk Division of the College of William and Mary) team (then known as the "Braves"), which was established in 1930 and discontinued after the 1939 season for eligibility and debt concerns. He coached the Braves to a 62–19–4 record during his tenure, including a 9–1 record in 1932 that resulted in an accidental trip to play in the Orange Bowl against the Miami Hurricanes. The Braves lost 6–2.

Aside from coaching football at Old Dominion, Scott also coached the track, baseball and men's basketball teams despite the fact that there were no facilities to practice on for any of the programs. The Braves had to play on makeshift fields and use hand-me-down uniforms from the College of William & Mary. He retired from teaching and coaching in 1941 to pursue a business career.

Scott was a 1926 graduate of Maury High School in Norfolk, and then a 1930 graduate of Virginia Military Institute in Lexington. While at VMI, he played left end for the Keydets football team.

References

External links
 Virginia Sports Hall of Fame profile

1907 births
1962 deaths
American football ends
Baseball players from Norfolk, Virginia
Basketball coaches from Virginia
Basketball players from Norfolk, Virginia
Old Dominion University faculty
Old Dominion Monarchs athletic directors
Old Dominion Monarchs baseball coaches
Old Dominion Monarchs men's basketball coaches
Old Dominion Monarchs football coaches
People from Onancock, Virginia
Players of American football from Norfolk, Virginia
Sportspeople from Norfolk, Virginia
VMI Keydets baseball players
VMI Keydets basketball players
VMI Keydets football players
American men's basketball players